is a train station located in Hakata-ku, Fukuoka in Japan. The station's symbol mark is Hie's initials "ひ" looks like earthenware, because Hie remains, and "ひ"'s each edges circle mean Hakata and Airport.

Lines

Platforms

Vicinity
Several schools
Hakata Civic Center
Hakata Social Insurance Office
Sanno Park

References

Kūkō Line (Fukuoka City Subway)
Railway stations in Fukuoka Prefecture